libt2n is a free Inter-process communication (IPC) library which offers a simple way for C++ applications to communicate with one another.

Introduction 
libt2n is an inter-process communication (IPC) system which is focused on ease of use and a minimum of code-lines needed to export and use methods. This is achieved by reducing the feature-set and relying on the serialization library developed at Boost. 

The goals of libt2n development are:
 easy to use, minimum of code-lines needed to export and use methods
 handles complex C++ structures like maps of vectors, etc.
 passes exceptions from the server back to the caller
 easy integration into GNU Autotools and Pkg-config

The limitations of the current libt2n implementation:
 C++ only
 Synchronous, blocking, no callbacks
 no server-side objects, just functions you can call
 no threads or multiple server processes for handling multiple requests at once

Architecture 
libt2n is divided in two parts:
 The library which is linked to every client and server
 The code generator used to create stubs and skeletons

The code generator does not use an Interface description language (IDL), but parses the source code of the server for special tags.  It produces the code needed to handle the calls on the server and a ready-to-use library for the client.

If a remote function is called, the client library creates an object describing the call, including all parameters.  This object is serialized using the Boost serialization library and transferred to the server. Currently this can be done using Unix domain sockets or TCP.  The server deserializes the object and calls the corresponding method.  The result (return value or exception) is again serialized and sent back to the client.

Trivia 
t2n is an abbreviation for 'talk to neighbor'.

References

External links

 Official libt2n website

Inter-process communication
C++
C++ libraries
Free software programmed in C++
Free computer libraries